The lambdoid suture (or lambdoidal suture) is a dense, fibrous connective tissue joint on the posterior aspect of the skull that connects the parietal bones with the occipital bone. It is continuous with the occipitomastoid suture.

Structure 
The lambdoid suture is between the paired parietal bones and the occipital bone of the skull. It runs from the asterion on each side.

Nerve supply 
The lambdoid suture may be supplied by a branch of the supraorbital nerve, a branch of the frontal branch of the trigeminal nerve.

Clinical significance 
At birth, the bones of the skull do not meet. If certain bones of the skull grow too fast, then craniosynostosis (premature closure of the  sutures) may occur.  This can result in skull deformities. If the lambdoid suture closes too soon on one side, the skull will appear twisted and asymmetrical, a condition called "plagiocephaly". Plagiocephaly refers to the shape and not the condition. The condition is craniosynostosis.

The lambdoid suture can be damaged by a fall backwards.

Etymology 
The lambdoid suture is named due to its uppercase lambda-like shape.

Additional images

References 

 "Sagittal suture." Stedman's Medical Dictionary, 27th ed. (2000).
 Moore, Keith L., and T.V.N. Persaud. The Developing Human: Clinically Oriented Embryology, 7th ed. (2003).

External links 

  (Posterior)
  (Lateral)
 

Bones of the head and neck
Cranial sutures
Human head and neck
Joints
Joints of the head and neck
Skeletal system
Skull